Innocence Project, Inc. is a 501(c)(3) nonprofit legal organization that is committed to exonerating individuals who have been wrongly convicted, through the use of DNA testing and working to reform the criminal justice system to prevent future injustice. The group cites various studies estimating that in the United States between 2.3% and 10% of all prisoners are innocent. The Innocence Project was founded in 1992 by Barry Scheck and Peter Neufeld who gained national attention in the mid-1990s as part of the "Dream Team" of lawyers who formed part of the defense in the O. J. Simpson murder case.

, the Innocence Project has helped to successfully overturn over 300 convictions through DNA-based exonerations. In 2021, Innocence Project received the biennial Milton Friedman Prize for Advancing Liberty by Cato Institute, awarded  in recognition and gratitude for its work to ensure liberty and justice for all. In March 2022, The Innocence Project won two Webby Awards for its Happiest Moments video, winning the Best Humanitarian & Services campaign in both the brand and non-profit categories. Happiest Moments was the organizations first-ever public service announcement that premiered in June 2021 and was produced by Hayden5.

Founding
The Innocence Project was established in the wake of a study by the U.S. Department of Justice and U.S. Senate, in conjunction with Yeshiva University's Benjamin N. Cardozo School of Law, which claimed that incorrect identification by eyewitnesses was a factor in over 70% of wrongful convictions. The Innocence Project was founded in 1992 by Scheck and Neufeld as part of a law clinic at Cardozo. It became an independent 501(c)(3) nonprofit organization on January 28, 2003, but it maintains institutional connections with Cardozo. Madeline deLone was the executive director from 2004 until 2020, succeeded by Christina Swarns on September 8, 2020.

The Innocence Project is the headquarters of the Innocence Network, a group of nearly 70 independent innocence organizations worldwide. One such example exists in the Republic of Ireland where in 2009 a project was set up at Griffith College Dublin.

Mission
The Innocence Project's mission is "to free the staggering number of innocent people who remain incarcerated, and to bring reform to the system responsible for their unjust imprisonment."

The Innocence Project focuses exclusively on post-conviction appeals in which DNA evidence is available to be tested or retested. DNA testing is possible in 5–10% of criminal cases. Other members of the Innocence Network also help to exonerate those in whose cases DNA testing is not possible.

In addition to working on behalf of those who may have been wrongfully convicted of crimes throughout the United States, those working for the Innocence Project perform research and advocacy related to the causes of wrongful convictions.

Some of the Innocence Project's successes have resulted in releasing people from death row. The successes of the project have fueled American opposition to the death penalty and have likely been a factor in the decision by some American states to institute moratoria on criminal executions.

In District Attorney's Office v. Osborne (2009), US Supreme Court Chief Justice Roberts wrote that post-conviction challenge "poses questions to our criminal justice systems and our traditional notions of finality better left to elected officials than federal judges." In the opinion, another justice wrote that forensic science has "serious deficiencies". Roberts also said that post-conviction DNA testing risks "unnecessarily overthrowing the established system of criminal justice." Law professor Kevin Jon Heller wrote: "It might lead to a reasonably accurate one."

The Innocence Project, as of June 2018, receives 55% of its funding from individual contributions, 16% from foundations, 16% from events, 8% from investments, and the remaining 5% from corporations, Yeshiva University, and other sources.

Work
The Innocence Project originated in New York City but accepts cases from other parts of the country. The majority of clients helped are of low socio-economic status and have used all possible legal options for justice. Many clients hope that DNA evidence will prove their innocence, as the emergence of DNA testing allows those who have been wrongly convicted of crimes to challenge their cases. The Innocence Project also works with the local, state and federal levels of law enforcement, legislators, and other programs to prevent further wrongful convictions.

All potential clients go through an extensive screening process to determine whether or not they are likely to be innocent. If they pass the process, the Innocence Project takes up their case, resources permitting. About 2,400 prisoners write to the Innocence Project annually, and at any given time the Innocence Project is evaluating 6,000 to 8,000 potential cases. In addition to their co-directors and a managing attorney, the Innocence Project has six full-time staff attorneys and nearly 300 active cases.

In almost half of the cases that the Innocence Project takes on, the clients' guilt is reconfirmed by DNA testing. Of all the cases taken on by the Innocence Project so far, about 43% of clients were proven innocent, 42% were confirmed guilty, and evidence was inconclusive and not probative in 15% of cases. In about 40% of all DNA exoneration cases, law enforcement officials identified the actual perpetrator based on the same DNA test results that led to an exoneration.

Overturned convictions

, 375 people previously convicted of serious crimes in the United States had been exonerated by DNA testing since 1989, 21 of whom had been sentenced to death. Almost all (99%) of the wrongful convictions were males, with minority groups constituting approximately 70% (61% African American and 8% Latino). The National Registry of Exonerations lists 2,939 convicted defendants who were exonerated through DNA and non-DNA evidence from January, 1989 through January, 2022 with more than 25,600 years imprisoned. 

According to a study published in 2014, at least 4.1% of persons overall sentenced to death from 1973 to 2004 are probably innocent. The following are some examples of exonerations they helped bring about:

 Steven Avery was exonerated in 2003 after serving 18 years in prison for a sexual assault charge. After his release, he was convicted of murder.
 Cornelius Dupree was convicted of sexual assault and robbery in 1980, and exonerated by DNA evidence in 2011 by the Innocence Project.
 Douglas Echols and Samuel Scott were convicted in 1987 of sexual assault and robbery, and exonerated in 2002 by DNA evidence by the Innocence Project.
 Clarence Elkins was convicted in 1999 for rape and murder, and exonerated by DNA evidence in 2005; defended by Ohio Innocence Project.
 Ryan Ferguson was convicted in 2005 for a 2001 murder, and exonerated in 2013 because the prosecution withheld exculpatory evidence and the witnesses who testified against him recanted their testimony; defended by Missouri Innocence Project.
 Glenn Ford was exonerated in 2014 in the murder of Isadore Newman. Ford, an African American, had been convicted by an all-white jury without any physical evidence linking him to the crime and with testimony withheld. He served 30 years on death row in Angola Prison before his release.
 Darryl Hunt was exonerated in 2004 after serving  years in prison of a life sentence for the rape and murder of a newspaper copy editor, Deborah Sykes.
 Michael Morton was convicted of murder in 1987, spent over 24 years in prison, and exonerated through DNA and withholding of evidence in 2011 with help from the Innocence Project. In 2013 his prosecutor was convicted of withholding evidence, agreed to disbarment, and spent 4 days in jail.
 Anthony Porter was convicted of murder in 1983, and exonerated in 1999 by the Medill Innocence Project.
 James Calvin Tillman was exonerated in 2007 after an investigation begun by the Innocence Project, and after serving  years in prison for a rape he did not commit. His sentence was 45 years.
 Archie Williams was convicted in 1983 of sexual assault and sentenced to life without the possibility of parole, but was exonerated in 2019 due to DNA evidence after over three decades in prison.
 Ken Wyniemko was convicted in 1994 of sexual assault, and exonerated in 2003 through DNA evidence by the Innocence Project.

Innocence Network
The Innocence Project is a founding member of the Innocence Network, a coalition of independent organizations and advocates, including law schools, journalism schools, and public defense offices that collaborate to help convicted felons prove their innocence. , there were 68 organizations in the network, operating in all 50 US states and 12 other countries, and had helped exonerate 625 people.

In South Africa, the Wits Justice Project investigates South African incarcerations. In partnership with the Wits Law Clinic, the Julia Mashele Trust, the Legal Resources Centre (LRC), the Open Democracy Advice Centre (ODAC), the US Innocence Project, and the Justice Project investigate individual cases of prisoners wrongly convicted or awaiting trial.

Causes of wrongful conviction
Wrongful convictions are a common occurrence with various causes that land innocent defendants in prison. Most common are false eyewitness accounts, where the accused are incorrectly identified by viewers of a crime. This accounts for 69% of the exonerations that took place due to the Innocence Project, further proving that eyewitness accounts are often unreliable. This measure has proven to be inaccurate in many police lineups, as there is much bias, and suspects can be singled out based on their appearance and the frequency that they are placed in front of witnesses.

Additionally, 52% of the Innocence Project cases’ wrongful convictions have resulted from the misapplication of forensic science. These include faulty hair comparisons, arson artifacts, and comparative bullet lead analysis. These methods of evidence collection evolve as new technology arises, but said technology can take decades to create, making cases based on the faulty forensic science cases difficult to overturn.

In 26% of DNA exoneration cases—and more than double that number in homicide cases—innocent people were coerced into making false confessions. Many of these false confessors went on to plead guilty to crimes they did not commit (usually to avoid a harsher sentence or even the death penalty). Currently, there is a racial aspect of this issue where many black people are discriminated against during both their trial and while in jail. The hashtag #blackbehindbars has allowed those exonerated after false confessions to share their stories and the injustice they faced due to the failure of the criminal justice system. 

Another large contributor of wrongful convictions is fabricated testimonies that falsely incriminate defendants. The Innocence Project has found that 17% of its cases have been caused by false testimonies, allowing the person who gave the testimony a shorter or better sentence while the accused face harsher repercussions. Many of these stories are given by inmates who have been given an incentive to falsely testify against certain people with rewards such as reduction of their sentences or leniency in prison.

In popular culture

Film 
 After Innocence (2005) is a documentary featuring the stories of eight wrongfully convicted men who were exonerated by the Innocence Project.
 Conviction (2010) is a film about the exoneration of Kenneth Waters, who was a client of the Innocence Project. Hilary Swank plays Waters' sister Betty Anne, who went to college and law school to fight for his freedom, and Sam Rockwell plays Waters. Barry Scheck is portrayed by Peter Gallagher.
 Happiest Moments (2021) is a Webby Award winning video by Innocence Project. Its the organizations first-ever public service announcement, produced by Hayden5.

Literature 
 In his nonfiction book The Innocent Man: Murder and Injustice in a Small Town (2006), John Grisham recounted the cases of Ron Williamson and Dennis Fritz, who were assisted on appeal by the Innocence Project and freed by DNA evidence after being wrongfully convicted of the murder of Debra Ann Carter.

Podcasts 
Serial in its first season referenced the Innocence Project in episode 7 when Deirdre Enright, director of investigation for the Innocence Project at the University of Virginia School of Law, and a team of law students analyzed the case against Adnan Syed.

Television 
Castle, an American television series, in the episode "Like Father, Like Daughter" (season 6, episode 7), mentioned the Innocence Project, as well as Frank Henson who was wrongfully convicted in 1998 of the death of Kimberly Tolbert.
The Innocence Project, a BBC One drama series that aired from 2006 to 2007, is based on a UK version of the organization.
The Innocence Project was discussed in season 2, episode 9 of The Good Wife, "Nine Hours" (December 14, 2010). Project co-founder Barry Scheck played himself in the episode, which was largely based on the actual Innocence Project case of Cameron Todd Willingham. Cary Agos, a recurring character on The Good Wife, is written to have worked for the Innocence Project after law school (and is a family friend of Scheck's).
In season six of Suits, a US legal dramedy, law student and paralegal Rachel Zane takes on an Innocence Project for a man wrongfully accused of murder.
In season three of Riverdale, a dark reimagining of the Archie Comics universe, Veronica Lodge mentions starting a chapter of the organization to help free her boyfriend Archie Andrews from prison following being falsely convicted of murder.
Making a Murderer, a two-season (of 10 episodes each) documentary relating Steven Avery wrongful conviction. The episodes were released on Netflix between 2015 and 2018.
 The Innocence Files (2020) is a series of nine documentary films based on the work of the Innocence Project, released on Netflix in April 2020.
Quantum Leap, in the episode "Ben Song for the Defense" the Innocence Project is mentioned after Ben, having leapt into a public defender, successfully defends a teenager wrongfully accused of killing a gang recruiter.

See also
 Miscarriage of justice
 List of miscarriage of justice cases
 List of wrongful convictions in the United States
Innocent prisoner's dilemma

Related groups and regional chapters

 Alaska Innocence Project
 California Innocence Project
 Georgia Innocence Project
 Illinois Innocence Project
 Innocence Canada
 Innocence Project of Texas
 Innocence Project New Orleans
 Investigating Innocence
 The Justice Project (Australia)
 Los Angeles Innocence Project (LAIP)
 Medill Innocence Project, Illinois
 Nebraska Innocence Project
 Northern California Innocence Project

References

Further reading

External links
 
 Innocence Network
 Innocence Network UK (INUK) – An organisation to facilitate casework on alleged wrongful convictions by innocence projects
 Innocent.org.uk – Website of UK cases of alleged and proven miscarriages of justice

Yeshiva University
Government watchdog groups in the United States
Legal advocacy organizations in the United States
Non-profit organizations based in New York City
Overturned convictions in the United States
Prison-related organizations
Innocence Project
Criminal defense organizations
Organizations established in 1992
DNA profiling techniques